Kentucky Route 189 (KY 189) is a  state highway in Kentucky that runs from Kentucky Route 507 and Flat Rock Road west of Allegre to U.S. Route 62 northeast of Powderly via Fearsville.

Route description 
KY 189 starts at an intersection with KY 507 in rural western Todd County between Allegre and Pilot Rock. It passes through the communities of Fearsville and Fruit Hill and respectively has intersections with Kentucky Routes107 and 800 in that area.

KY 189 then crosses the Pond River into Muhlenberg County. It intersects U.S. Route 62 (US 62) on the west side of Greenville. After the junction with KY 181, KY 189 closely follows US 62 from Greenville's northern outskirts and the southern end of Powderly all the way to the route's current northern terminus at another intersection with US 62 just southwest of Central City.

History
At one time, KY 189 ran concurrently with US 62 from the second junction between the two routes and Central City. KY 189 had also bypassed Central City to the west and ended at a junction with US 431 just south of South Carrollton. That bypass was also designated as part of the truck route of US 431 and KY 70 on the west side of Central City. KY 189 was decommissioned from the Central City bypass when US 431 and KY 70 were rerouted to overlap US 62 and then turn onto the bypass. Since then, KY 189 has ended at the US 62 junction just south of Central City.

Major intersections

Greenville connector

Kentucky Route 189 Connector (KY 189 Conn) is a  connector route of KY 189 that connects to U.S. Route 62 in northeastern Greenville.

Major intersections

References

0189
0189
0189
0189